The Rajshahi ethnic cleansing, marked by widespread ethnic violence and killings of minority Hindus, took place in April 1962 in Rajshahi and Pabna districts of East Pakistan. People and property were attacked. Around three hundred non-Muslims died in the massacre.

Background 
In 1958 the military junta led by Ayub Khan came to power in Pakistan.

Killings 
On 22 March 1962, an ethnic riot broke out between the Santhals and the Muslims in the Malda district of West Bengal. The Santhals, armed with bows and arrows, shot dead three Muslims while six were burnt to death. Between 16 and 20 April, the ethnic tension between the two groups led to another ethnic riot.

The Pakistani press not only published exaggerated figures of Muslim casualties in Maldah district, even though there was no incident of ethnic violence in the district. Pakistan Radio too broadcast false stories of atrocities on minorities in India. On 22 April, Lieutenant General Muhammad Azam Khan, the Governor of East Pakistan, delivered an inflammatory speech with imaginary stories of torture on minorities in India. On 23 April, the Bengali Hindus and other ethnic minorities were attacked in the Rajshahi Division. The District Magistrate of Rajshahi did not take any steps to stop the attacks. Killings, rape, loot and arson continued for days. They were attacked in the passenger trains at the Rajshahi railway station and in the market adjacent to the Natore railway station. In Sarusa village of Hujuri Para Union under Paba police station, the Hindus were attacked and many were seriously afflicted. In Darsa village under Paba police station 10 people were killed. Thousands non-muslims are taken shelter in a school but brutally it was burnt.  An estimated 3000 non-Muslims were killed in Rajshahi district.

The Assistant High Commissioner in Rajshahi came to the rescue of the minorities. The intervention of the Indian Assistant High Commission at resulted in the troops being called and the massacre was stopped. The Pakistan government whipped up a war hysteria and the Indian Deputy High Commission at Dhaka was placed under military guard. It was impossible for the Indian Deputy High Commission to collect information on the attacks on the minorities. Rajeshwar Dayal, the Indian High Commissioner to Pakistan who had come to Dhaka too, was not allowed to visit the districts of Rajshahi and Pabna.

Exodus 
Around 11,000 Santhals and Rajbanshis migrated to India.

See also
 Freedom of religion in Bangladesh
 Human rights in Bangladesh

References 

Massacres of Bengali Hindus in East Pakistan
1962 in Pakistan
Mass murder in 1962
Massacres in Pakistan
History of East Pakistan
Ethnic cleansing in Pakistan
April 1962 events in Asia
1962 murders in Pakistan
Persecution of Buddhists by Muslims
Massacres in 1962